As part of the 2014 Swedish general election, an election to the Stockholm Municipal Council was held on 14 September 2014, electing all 101 members of the Stockholm Municipal Council through a modified form of the Sainte-Laguë method of party-list proportional representation.

Before the 2014 election, the four parties of the center-right Alliance held a majority in the Stockholm Council, with 52 of the 101 seats.

Opinion polling

References

Municipal elections in Stockholm
2014 elections in Sweden
2010s in Stockholm
September 2014 events in Europe